The Big Quiz is a British entertainment quiz show hosted by Stephen Mulhern. 
It started as an annual quiz between soap operas Coronation Street and Emmerdale.

Episodes

Episode 1 (2011)
The first episode aired on 16 December 2011 with the teams consisting of the casts of Coronation Street: Jennie McAlpine, Malcolm Hebden, Patti Clare and Jack P. Shepherd and Emmerdale: Mark Charnock, Natalie Anderson, Danny Miller and Meg Johnson.

Episode 2 (2012)
The second episode aired on 15 April 2012 with the teams consisting of the cast of the hit comedy Benidorm: Jake Canuso, Crissy Rock, Janine Duvitski and Shelley Longworth and the ITV2 reality show The Only Way is Essex: Joey Essex, Lauren Goodger, James Argent and Gemma Collins.

Episode 3 (2012)
The third episode (The Big Sports Quiz) aired on 26 July 2012 and saw boys and girls battle for who's the best at sport, fronting the teams were 71 Degrees North presenters Charlotte Jackson and Paddy McGuinness and panellists Joe Hart, Kriss Akabusi, Mark Foster, Amy Williams, Karen Pickering and Louise Hazel.

Episode 4 (2016)
A fourth episode of The Big Quiz aired on 1 January 2016. The teams were Coronation Street vs. Emmerdale. Playing for Coronation Street were Michael Le Vell, Brooke Vincent, Sue Cleaver and Jack P. Shepherd. Playing for Emmerdale were Mark Charnock, Charlotte Bellamy, Liam Fox and Samantha Giles were playing. Emmerdale were the victors of the game.

Episode 5 (2017)
A fifth episode of The Big Quiz aired on 6 January 2017. Once again, the teams were Coronation Street vs. Emmerdale and Stephen Mulhern returned to present the episode.

Episode 6 (2018)
A sixth episode of The Big Quiz aired on 5 January 2018. Once again, the teams were Coronation Street vs. Emmerdale and Stephen Mulhern returned to present the episode.

Episode 7 (2018)
A seventh episode of The Big Quiz aired on 21 December 2018. Once again, the teams were Coronation Street vs. Emmerdale and Stephen Mulhern returned to present the episode.

Episode 8 (2019)
An eighth episode of The Big Quiz aired on 19 December 2019. Once again the teams were Coronation Street vs. Emmerdale and Stephen Mulhern returned to present the episode.

Episode 9 (2020)
A ninth episode of The Big Quiz aired on 21 December 2020. Once again, the teams were Coronation Street vs. Emmerdale and Stephen Mulhern returned to present the episode.

Episode 10 (2021)
A tenth episode of The Big Quiz aired on 20 December 2021. Once again, the teams were Coronation Street vs. Emmerdale and Stephen Mulhern returned to present the episode.

Episode 11 (2022)
A eleventh episode of The Big Quiz aired on 9 December 2022. Once again, the teams were Coronation Street vs. Emmerdale and Stephen Mulhern returned to present the episode.

References

External links

2010s British game shows
2020s British game shows
2011 British television series debuts
ITV game shows
Television series by ITV Studios